Vadim Vladimirovich Lazarev (born 4 February 2000) is a Russian football player. He plays for FC Znamya Truda Orekhovo-Zuyevo.

Club career
He played for PFC CSKA Moscow in the 2017–18 UEFA Youth League.

He made his debut in the Russian Football National League for FC Chayka Peschanokopskoye on 7 July 2019 in a game against FC Chertanovo Moscow.

References

External links
 Profile by Russian Football National League
 
 
 

2000 births
Living people
Russian footballers
Association football defenders
FC Inter Cherkessk players
FC Chayka Peschanokopskoye players
FC Znamya Truda Orekhovo-Zuyevo players
Russian First League players
Russian Second League players